All In: The Fight for Democracy is a 2020 American documentary film directed and produced by Liz Garbus and Lisa Cortés. The film revolves around voter suppression. Stacey Abrams worked with Garbus and Cortés on the film. It was released in a limited theatrical release on September 9, 2020, followed by digital streaming on Amazon Prime Video on September 18, 2020, by Amazon Studios. Originally Abrams, a Georgia state representative, did not intend to be part of the film; eventually she agreed to include her gubernatorial race as part of the story.

Cast

Release
In June 2020, Amazon Studios acquired distribution rights to the film, with intention to release before the 2020 United States presidential election. It was released in a limited theatrical release on September 9, 2020, followed by digital streaming on Amazon Prime Video on September 18, 2020.
It was set to have its world premiere at the Telluride Film Festival in September 2020, prior to its cancellation due to the COVID-19 pandemic.

On September 9, 2020, coinciding with the film's release, musician Janelle Monáe released the single "Turntables", a song which was featured in the film.

Critical reception
The site's critics consensus reads: "All In: The Fight for Democracy lives up to its title as a galvanizing rallying cry for voters to exercise—and preserve—their right to be heard." On Metacritic, the film has a weighted average score of 78 out of 100, based on eight critics, indicating "generally favorable reviews".

References

External links
 
 
 All In: The Fight for Democracy on Amazon Prime Video

2020 films
Amazon Studios films
American documentary films
Documentary films about American politics
Films directed by Liz Garbus
2020s English-language films
2020s American films